Jeffrey Craig Halpern (born May 3, 1976) is an American former professional ice hockey player. He played for the Washington Capitals twice, Dallas Stars, Tampa Bay Lightning, Los Angeles Kings, New York Rangers, Montreal Canadiens, and Phoenix Coyotes. In 14 NHL seasons, he had 152 goals and 221 assists (373 points) in 976 regular-season games. He also had seven goals and 14 points in 39 Stanley Cup playoff games. He was also captain of the United States national team for the 2008 World Championships.

He is currently an assistant coach for the Tampa Bay Lightning of the NHL.

Early life
Halpern was born in Potomac, Maryland, to Gloria (née Klein) and Melvin Halpern.  As a youth, he played in the 1989 and 1990 Quebec International Pee-Wee Hockey Tournaments with the Washington Capitals minor ice hockey team.  Halpern attended Winston Churchill High School in Potomac, which at the time did not have a hockey team. In order to pursue his dreams as a hockey player, Halpern transferred to and later graduated from St. Paul's School in Concord, New Hampshire where he was roommates with future The Bachelorette winner Ian McKee. He then attended and graduated from Princeton University.  There, he played four seasons of varsity hockey for the Princeton Tigers men's ice hockey team, was named an ECAC second team All-Star in 1998 and 1999, and in 1999 he scored 22 goals to tie for the most goals in the ECAC and was co-winner of Princeton's Roper Trophy for athletic and academic achievement.

Playing career
Undrafted, Halpern began his NHL career in the 1999–2000 NHL season for the Washington Capitals.  He played in 79 games, scoring 18 goals with 11 assists, and was +21. He was the first member of the Capitals to be born and raised in the Washington, D.C. area.

The 2003–04 NHL season was his highest-scoring season to date as he finished with 19 goals and 27 assists in 79 games.

During the 2004–05 NHL lockout, Halpern played for the Kloten Flyers and for HC Ajoie in Switzerland, and returned to the Capitals when the lockout ended. On September 23, 2005, the Washington Capitals named Halpern the twelfth team captain in franchise history.  In the 2005–06 NHL season, he scored 11 goals, and added a career-high 33 assists.

On July 5, 2006, Halpern left the Capitals as a free agent and signed a four-year deal with the Dallas Stars.

On February 26, 2008, Halpern was dealt to the Tampa Bay Lightning along with Mike Smith, Jussi Jokinen, and a 2009 4th-round draft pick in exchange for Brad Richards and Johan Holmqvist. Halpern scored a goal in his Lightning debut, and added an assist. After being acquired by the Lightning, Halpern went on a huge hot streak, scoring 10 goals and 18 points in 19 games. He also led the league during the 2007–08 NHL season in games played as one of only two players to appear in 83 games, or one more than a team's full schedule, as a result of his trade to Tampa Bay. The other was Brian Campbell. Playing in 52 games during the 2008-09 NHL Season, Halpern scored seven goals to go with nine assists.

Halpern was named the captain of the United States national team for the 2008 World Championships in Canada. Playing in a 5–4 loss in the opening round against the Canadian team on May 6, 2008, he suffered a ruptured anterior cruciate ligament and was expected to be out of action for 6–8 months.  This occurred in the same game where USA goaltender Tim Thomas was injured and had to leave the team.

Halpern was traded from the Lightning to the Los Angeles Kings March 3, 2010, in exchange for Teddy Purcell and a 3rd round draft pick in 2010.

On September 7, 2010, Halpern signed a one-year contract with the Montreal Canadiens.  He signed a one-year contract worth $825,000 to return to his original team the Washington Capitals on July 1, 2011.

On July 9, 2012, once again as a veteran free agent, Halpern was signed to a one-year deal with the New York Rangers. With the 2012–13 season delayed due to the lockout, Halpern made his debut with the Rangers in the shortened season opener on the fourth line in a defeat against the Boston Bruins on January 19, 2013. In 30 games with the Rangers as a checking line forward, Halpern produced one assist before he was claimed off waivers to return to the Montreal Canadiens on March 23, 2013.  For the season, he had a goal and two assists in 46 games for the Rangers and Canadiens.

In 13 NHL seasons at that point he had 147 goals and 214  assists (361 points) in 907 regular-season games.  He also had seven goals and 14 points in 39 Stanley Cup playoff games.

On September 16, 2013, Halpern signed a one-year contract with Finnish Elite League team TPS, and was expected to make his SM-liiga debut in October. His contract included an NHL-clause.  With the team, he scored four goals in eight games.

On October 12, 2013. Halpern left the Finnish team and signed a one-year, two-way contract with the Phoenix Coyotes. It would pay him $600,000 in the NHL, and $75,000 in the AHL.

Coaching career
On June 27, 2016, the Tampa Bay Lightning announced that Halpern would serve as a full-time assistant coach for the Lightning's AHL affiliate, the Syracuse Crunch.

On June 22, 2018, the Tampa Bay Lightning named Halpern as assistant coach after parting ways with Rick Bowness. As an assistant coach, he won the Stanley Cup with the Lightning in the 2020 and 2021 seasons. On July 7, 2021, Halpern won his second Stanley Cup as an assistant coach with the Tampa Bay Lightning.

Personal life
Halpern, who is Jewish, is a member of the Greater Washington (D.C.) Jewish Sports Hall of Fame.  Halpern sat out a game in 2005 to observe Yom Kippur.

He has been married to former cheerleader Kelley Cornwell, a convert to Judaism, since June 2011. The couple have four children.

Career statistics

Regular season and playoffs

International

See also
List of select Jewish ice hockey players

Awards and honors

References

External links
 

1976 births
Living people
American men's ice hockey centers
Dallas Stars players
Ice hockey people from Maryland
Jewish American sportspeople
Jewish ice hockey players
EHC Kloten players
Los Angeles Kings players
Montreal Canadiens players
New York Rangers players
People from Potomac, Maryland
Phoenix Coyotes players
Portland Pirates players
Princeton Tigers men's ice hockey players
Stanley Cup champions
Tampa Bay Lightning players
HC TPS players
Undrafted National Hockey League players
Washington Capitals captains
Washington Capitals players
Tampa Bay Lightning coaches
21st-century American Jews